Augusto César Veríssimo Galvan (born 25 March 1999), known as Augusto Galvan or simply Augusto, is a Brazilian footballer who plays for Azuriz. Mainly an attacking midfielder, he can also play as a left winger.

Club career

Early career
Born in Ribeirão Preto, São Paulo, Augusto joined São Paulo's youth setup in 2013. On 24 February 2017, as his contract was due to expire in March, he was sold to Real Madrid for a rumoured fee of €3 million. Prior to the transfer, he was separated from the under-17 squad after rejecting an offer of a professional contract.

Real Madrid

Castilla
After spending his first season in the Juvenil A squad, Augusto was promoted to Santiago Solari's reserves in Segunda División B for the 2018–19 campaign. He made his senior debut on 29 September 2018, coming on as a late substitute for Jaime Seoane in a 3–1 home win against CDA Navalcarnero.

Augusto contributed with 19 league appearances in his first senior season, being mainly used as a substitute as Castilla missed out promotion in the play-offs.

Loan to Cultural Leonesa
On 18 July 2019, Augusto joined fellow third division side Cultural y Deportiva Leonesa on loan for one year. He scored his first senior goal on 19 December, netting his team's second in a 3–0 home success over Las Rozas CF, for the season's Copa del Rey.

In February 2020, Augusto suffered a shoulder injury which kept him out for three months. He featured in ten matches for the side, as the season was curtailed due to the COVID-19 pandemic.

Loan to Las Rozas
On 2 October 2020, Augusto moved to Las Rozas also in the third tier, on loan for one year. While at the club, he featured more regularly, and notably scored in a 3–4 home loss against La Liga side SD Eibar also for the national cup.

Loan to Santos
On 16 August 2021, Augusto returned to Brazil and agreed to a one-year loan deal with Santos. He appeared for the under-23 side in the 2021 Copa Paulista, but never featured with the main squad, being separated from the side in March 2022.

Azuriz
In January 2023, Augusto joined Azuriz.

Career statistics

References

External links
Real Madrid profile

1999 births
Living people
People from Ribeirão Preto
Brazilian footballers
Association football midfielders
Segunda División B players
Campeonato Paranaense players
Real Madrid Castilla footballers
Cultural Leonesa footballers
Las Rozas CF players
Santos FC players
Azuriz Futebol Clube players
Brazilian expatriate footballers
Brazilian expatriate sportspeople in Spain
Expatriate footballers in Spain
Footballers from São Paulo (state)